Valeriy Aveskulov (born January 31, 1986, in Antratsyt, Ukraine) is a chess Grandmaster (2006) and Ukrainian Champion in 2007.

In 2006, he won the Femida Tournament in Kharkiv and tied for 4th–6th with Mikhailo Oleksienko and Nazar Firman in the Vasylyshyn Memorial in Lviv. In 2007, he came first in the OCF North American FIDE Open in Stillwater, Oklahoma.

His handle on the Internet Chess Club is "Prokuror".

References

External links
 
 
 
 Valeriy Aveskulov at ChessTao.com
 Valeriy Aveskulov Achievements at GrossClub.com

1986 births
Living people
Chess grandmasters
Ukrainian chess players
People from Antratsyt